Rhinonyssus is a genus of mites in the family Rhinonyssidae. There are more than 30 described species in Rhinonyssus.

Species
These 36 species belong to the genus Rhinonyssus:

 Rhinonyssus afribyx Fain, 1956
 Rhinonyssus alberti Strandtmann, 1956
 Rhinonyssus apus Fain, 1957
 Rhinonyssus belenopteri Fain, 1964
 Rhinonyssus bregetovae Butenko, 1974
 Rhinonyssus caledonicus Hirst, 1921
 Rhinonyssus chettusiae Butenko, 1973
 Rhinonyssus clangulae Butenko & Stanyukovich, 2001
 Rhinonyssus colymbicola Fain & Bafort, 1963
 Rhinonyssus coniventris Trouessart, 1894
 Rhinonyssus derojasi Dimov, 2020
 Rhinonyssus dobromiri Dimov & Spicer, 2013
 Rhinonyssus echinipes Hirst, 1921
 Rhinonyssus himantopus Strandtmann, 1951
 Rhinonyssus kadrae Dimov, 2013
 Rhinonyssus karelinae Dimov, 2020
 Rhinonyssus levinseni (Tragardh, 1904)
 Rhinonyssus marilae Butenko & Stanyukovich, 2001
 Rhinonyssus mileni Dimov, 2020
 Rhinonyssus minutus Fain, 1972
 Rhinonyssus neglectus Hirst, 1921
 Rhinonyssus pluvialis Fain & Johnston, 1966
 Rhinonyssus podicipedus Feider & Mironescu, 1972
 Rhinonyssus podilymbi Pence, 1972
 Rhinonyssus poliocephali Fain, 1956
 Rhinonyssus polystictae Butenko, 1984
 Rhinonyssus rhinolethrum (Trouessart, 1895)
 Rhinonyssus shcherbininae Butenko, 1984
 Rhinonyssus sixli Dimov, 2020
 Rhinonyssus sphenisci Fain & Hyland, 1963
 Rhinonyssus spinactitis Dusbabek, 1969
 Rhinonyssus strandtmanni Fain & Johnston, 1966
 Rhinonyssus tringae Fain, 1963
 Rhinonyssus vanellochettusiae Butenko, 1984
 Rhinonyssus vanellus Fain, 1972
 Rhinonyssus waterstoni Hirst, 1921

References

Rhinonyssidae
Articles created by Qbugbot